The Hereditary Society Community of the United States of America ("HSC") is a non-profit organization, founded in 2002, which conveys the public interface for over 300 lineage societies. HSC's primary mission is to facilitate and increase the community's aggregate focus on genealogical accuracy; access to information and research tools; accurate public listing of contact data; non-partisan civic outreach; historical education; scholarship; and fraternity and collegiality between organizations. The organization meets every April, in Washington, D.C., for an annual meeting and gala event.

History 
American lineage societies have existed since the colonial period, and have provided avid genealogists and historians focused opportunities to study specific aspects of American history in juxtaposition with research into their own families. Prior to HSC, efforts to index the aggregate data related to American lineage societies included Bailey Banks and Biddle's (1917) American Orders & Societies and Their Decorations, John Griffin Richardson Rountree's (1970–1983) publication, The Hereditary Register, as well as a brief publication in the 1990s, The Hereditary Society Blue Book.

Catalyzed by the considerable deficit of any indexed publication, or viable knowledge management platform, several key leaders in the wider lineage society community founded HSC. Their primary focus, at that time, was to increase synergy within the burgeoning community of disparate groups, as well as to provide a means to transition modern lineage societies and their members toward more equitable outcomes. The organization has maintained its commitment to inclusiveness and diversity, and a consistent focus on making the study of genealogy relevant to the widest array of the population. The organization was incorporated in October, 2002, and held its first formal meeting in April, 2003 at the Washington Club at Dupont Circle.

Governance 
The organization operates under the governance of a Council (Board of Directors) and a Cabinet (Advisory Board). The Council consists of fifteen individuals. Twelve are life appointments and three consist of the sitting executive leaders, during their respective terms, of the Society of the Cincinnati (President General); the National Society Daughters of the American Revolution (President General); and the National Gavel Society (President). The ten original incorporators included Barry Christopher Howard (President); John Griffin Richardson Rountree (Vice President); Brantley Carter Bolling Knowles (Secretary); John Hallberg Jones (Treasurer); Dixon A. Barr, Ph.D.; Timothy Field Beard, F.A.S.G; Charles Owen Johnson, Esq.; COL Stewart Boone McCarty, Jr.; Eleanor Warrene Smallwood Niebell; and Albert Clinton Walling II, Ph.D.

Activities 
The website, and subsequent social media platforms provide a wide outreach to the community. Additionally, HSC actively engages collaboration between numerous, diverse lineage societies, coordinating a cohesive annual schedule of meetings. It also provides public access to a clearing house for accurately vetted contact and membership information, as well as an historical record of the insignia and regalia associated with the many groups within the community.

Notably, HSC, along with approximately 90 lineage societies hold their annual board and membership meetings in Washington, D.C. during the month of April each year. Since 2002, HSC has assisted with the coordination of those meetings, providing guidance, as well as a highly trafficked calendar of events. This period of annual meetings is referred to as the 'Hereditary Fortnight', although it extends for a full three-week period from start to finish. The events of the Hereditary Fortnight have grown over time, and were originally anchored around the annual meeting of the National Society Daughters of the American Revolution. In the 1940s, the DAR moved its annual meetings, at Constitution Hall, to the month of July, while the smaller lineage societies, in gradually increasing numbers, continued to meet in April in the ensuing decades, to the present day.

HSC meets annually in Washington, D.C., during the Hereditary Fortnight, at a formal (white tie) gala event. The evening is an opportunity for the confluence of the officers from numerous lineage societies, to meet together. Past venues have included the Willard, Anderson House, Cosmos Club, and, for the first eleven year of HSC's existence, the old Washington Club. At those gala functions, four to six key lineage societies leaders are recognized as Honorary Members of HSC. Each Honorary Member receives a perpetual listing on the website and a coveted HSC plaque, honoring their efforts. A retiring President General of the Society of the Cincinnati; a retiring President General of the National Society Daughters of the American Revolution; and a retiring President of the National Gavel Society, (if choosing to join the Council when eligible), as well as any recent, posthumous HSC Board member, are automatically elected to the Class for the year in which they retire or decease, in addition to the standard Honorary Members inducted that year. In determining prospective Honorary Members, the Council consider society leadership, membership, service, tenure, personal character, and life-long accomplishments.

In recent years, HSC has expanded its online presence to include two, separate social media forums to accommodate real-time interaction between lineage society members from over 300 organizations. In 2020 and 2021, during the COVID-19 pandemic, HSC planned, coordinated, and hosted multiple live, online discussions regarding the risks associated with the continuity of the Hereditary Fortnight, during the pandemic.

References

External links
 Official website

Genealogical societies
Lineage societies
Organizations established in 2002